"Only Your Love" is a song recorded by English girl group Bananarama, released as the first single from the group's fifth studio album, Pop Life (1991). The song was issued several months prior to the release of the album. The Pop Life album marked Bananarama's break from their relationship with the Stock Aitken Waterman (SAW) production trio. "Only Your Love" was co-written and produced by Youth. The album version of the song was remixed for its single release.

The song's primary rhythm, complete with "woo woo" hoots, directly references "Sympathy for the Devil". This led Jonathan Ross to jokingly thank The Rolling Stones after Bananarama had performed the song on his TV show. The song also contains samples of "Loaded" by Primal Scream, "Fool's Gold" by The Stone Roses, and “Funky Drummer” by James Brown. Upon its release "Only Your Love" received positive critical reviews. The song was not released as a single in the United States.

"Only Your Love" peaked at number 27 in the UK singles chart, which the group considered to be a disappointment. The single did not fare much better in other countries, hitting number 49 in New Zealand and 51 in Australia.

Critical reception
Mandi James  from NME wrote, "'Only Your Love' could be any of the Nana's other singles seeing as they have the vocal capacity of a stretched elastic band, except in all their postmodern glory they've half-inched the funky drummer break from 'Fool's Gold', bastardises the 'oooh, oooh' from 'Sympathy for the Devil' and created a monster. Tacky, trashy and fun, fun, fun."

Music video
The accompanying music video for "Only Your Love", directed by Philippe Gautier, features the girls on a studio set made to look like a cross between a train and a jungle gym, and uses silhouettes against multicoloured backdrops. They perform the song while dancing provocatively with various male dancers. The dancing features more physical contact between the girls and the male dancers than any of their other videos. The performance on the train is interspersed with shots of the girls singing on the front of the train engine in sunglasses and oversized dresses.

Remixes
 CD 1 single
"Only Your Love" (Milky Bar Mix) - (8:12)
Remixed by Robin Goodfellow
"Only Your Love" (Youth & Thrash on the Mix) - (4:17)
"Only Your Love" (Hardcore Instrumental) - (3:27)

 CD 2 single
"Only Your Love" (7" Mix) - (4:02)
"Only Your Love" (Milky Bar Mix) - (8:12)
Remixed by Robin Goodfellow
"Only Your Love" (Hardcore Instrumental) - (3:27)
"Only Your Love" (Youth & Thrash on the Mix) - (4:17)

 CD 3 single
"Only Your Love" (Milky Bar Mix) - (8:12)
Remixed by Robin Goodfellow
"Only Your Love" (Hardcore Instrumental) - (3:27)
"Only Your Love" (Youth & Thrash on the Mix) - (4:17)
"Only Your Love" (Paris Texas Instrumental) - (5:33)

 Other versions
"Only Your Love" (Album Version) - (3:58)
"Only Your Love" (Instrumental)
"Only Your Love" (The Monkey Drum Mooch) - (7:20)
Remixed by Terry Farley
"Only Your Love" (A Tribute to Barry Mooncult Mix) - (5:40)
Remixed by Terry Farley

Charts

References

1990 singles
Bananarama songs
London Records singles
Songs written by Sara Dallin
Songs written by Youth (musician)
1990 songs